The 1907 Georgia Bulldogs football team represented the Georgia Bulldogs of the University of Georgia during the 1907 college football season. The Bulldogs compiled a 4–3–1 record, including victories over Mercer, Auburn and Clemson. The victory over Clemson ended a seven-game losing streak to the Tigers. However, the season included Georgia fourth straight loss to Georgia Tech. One of the players on the 1907 team was quarterback George "Kid" Woodruff, who would become Georgia's head football coach in 1923.

The team started the season under the guidance of head coach Bull Whitney, but the season became marred by the "Ringer" controversy. At that time, there were no football scholarships, but enthusiastic alumni often raised money to pay professional players who were referred to as "ringers." After the 1907 game with Georgia Tech, it was revealed that there were at least four ringers on the Georgia and Georgia Tech teams. Thereafter, Georgia completed the season without its ringers and without Bull Whitney, who was forced to resign.  Branch Bocock actually coached the last three games of the 1907 season.

Schedule

References

Georgia
Georgia Bulldogs football seasons
Georgia Bulldogs football